KTMC (1400 AM) is a radio station licensed to McAlester, Oklahoma.  The station broadcasts an adult standards format and is owned by Southeastern Oklahoma Radio, LLC.

History
In late November 1947, C.E. Wilson and P.D. Jackson sold KTMC to J. Stanley O'Neill for $100,000. At that time, the station was an ABC affiliate operating on 1400 kHz with 250 W power.

Translators

References

External links
KTMC's website

TMC
Adult standards radio stations in the United States